Algirdas Saudargas (born April 17, 1948) is a Lithuanian politician and the signatory of the Act of the Re-Establishment of the State of Lithuania. He was the first foreign minister of post-Soviet Lithuania. He was foreign minister from March 24, 1990, to December 12, 1992, and again from December 4, 1996, to October 30, 2000. In 1992, Algirdas Saudargas, together with 9 other Baltic Ministers of Foreign Affairs and an EU commissioner, founded the Council of the Baltic Sea States (CBSS) and the EuroFaculty.

He was elected to the European Parliament in 2009.

External links 
 Algirdas Saudargas in the official website of Seimas

References

1948 births
Living people
Ministers of Foreign Affairs of Lithuania
Politicians from Kaunas
Homeland Union MEPs
MEPs for Lithuania 2009–2014
MEPs for Lithuania 2014–2019
Members of the Seimas
Recipients of the Order of Prince Yaroslav the Wise, 2nd class